Guy "Arc Angel" Waters (born 25 January 1964) is an Australian professional welter/light middle/middle/super middle/light heavy/cruiserweight boxer of the 1980s, 1990s and 2000s. He won the New South Wales State (Australia) light heavyweight title, Australian light heavyweight title, Oriental and Pacific Boxing Federation (OPBF) light heavyweight title, Australasian Light Heavyweight Title, World Boxing Federation (WBF) light heavyweight title, International Boxing Federation (IBF) Pan Pacific super middleweight title, Oriental and Pacific Boxing Federation (OPBF) super middleweight title, and Commonwealth light heavyweight title. He was also a challenger for the WBC light heavyweight title against Dennis Andries, World Boxing Association (WBA) World light heavyweight title against Virgil Hill, World Boxing Council (WBC) cruiserweight title against Juan Carlos Gómez, and Commonwealth super middleweight title against David Starie.

Professional boxing record

References

External links

1964 births
Cruiserweight boxers
Light-heavyweight boxers
Living people
Place of birth missing (living people)
Boxers from Sydney
Super-middleweight boxers
Australian male boxers
Commonwealth Boxing Council champions